Dolgoshchelskoye Rural Settlement is a rural settlement in the Mezensky Municipal District of Arkhangelsk Oblast in northern Russia. The rural settlement contains three villages. The administrative center is the selo of Dolgoshchelye.

References

Notes

Rural localities in Mezensky District